James Gibb Fotheringham (19 December 1933 – 16 September 1977) was a Scottish footballer, who played as a defender.

Fotheringham was a product of the Arsenal youth system and at 6'4" looked to be an imposing centre back. However, Fotheringham managed only a few runs in the first team and never really convinced before joining Heart of Midlothian for £10,000 in 1959. He returned to England with Northampton Town the same year only to see his career ended early by a bad injury.

Whilst at Arsenal he also featured for the London XI that took part in the Inter-Cities Fairs Cup.

References

External links 

1933 births
1977 deaths
Scottish footballers
English Football League players
Arsenal F.C. players
Heart of Midlothian F.C. players
Northampton Town F.C. players
Association football central defenders
Footballers from Hamilton, South Lanarkshire
London XI players